The Poor Relief Act 1662 (14 Car 2 c 12) was an Act of the Cavalier Parliament of England. It was an Act for the Better Relief of the Poor of this Kingdom and is also known as the Settlement Act or the Settlement and Removal Act. The purpose of the Act was to establish the parish to which a person belonged (i.e. his/her place of "settlement"), and hence clarify which parish was responsible for him should he become in need of Poor Relief (or "chargeable" to the parish poor rates). This was the first occasion when a document proving domicile became statutory: these were called "settlement certificates".

After 1662, if a man left his settled parish to move elsewhere, he had to take his settlement certificate, which guaranteed that his home parish would pay for his "removal" costs (from the host parish) back to his home if he needed poor relief. As parishes were often unwilling to issue such certificates, people often stayed where they wereknowing that, should they become indigent, they would be entitled to their parish's poor rate.

The 1662 Act stipulated that if a poor person (that is, resident of a tenancy with a taxable value less than £10 per year, who did not fall under the other protected categories) remained in the parish for forty days of undisturbed residency, he could acquire "settlement rights" in that parish. However, within those forty days, upon any local complaint, two JPs could remove the man and return him to his home parish. As a result, some parish officers dispatched their poor to other parishes, with instructions to remain hidden for forty days before revealing themselves.  This loophole was closed with the Reviving and Continuance Act 1685 (1 Ja. 2. c.17) which required new arrivals to register with parish authorities. But sympathetic parish officers often hid the registration, and did not reveal the presence of new arrivals until the required residency period was over.  As a result, the law was further tightened in 1692 (3 & 4 Will. & Mar. c. 11), and parish officers were obliged to publicly publish arrival registrations in writing in the local church Sunday circular, and read to the congregation, and that the forty days would only start counting from thereon.

The settlement laws benefited the owners of large estates who controlled housing. Some land owners demolished empty housing in order to reduce the population of their lands and prevent people from returning. It was also common to recruit labourers from neighbouring parishes so that they could easily be sacked. Magistrates could order parishes to grant poor relief. However, often the magistrates were landowners and therefore unlikely to make relief orders that would increase poor rates.

The Settlement Act was repealed in 1834 (under the terms of the Poor Law Amendment Act 1834, which introduced the union workhouses), although not fully. The concept of parish settlement has been characterised as "incompatible with the newly developing industrial system", because it hindered internal migration to factory towns.

It was finally repealed by section 245 of, and Schedule 11 to, the Poor Law Act 1927 (c.14) and by the Statute Law Revision Act 1948.

Settlement terms
To gain settlement in a parish a person had to meet at least one of the following conditions:-

Be born into the parish.
Have lived in the parish for forty consecutive days without complaint.
Be hired for over a year and a day that takes place within the parish – (this led to short lengths of hire so that settlement was not obtained).
Hold an office in the parish.
Rent a property worth £10 per year or pay the same in taxes.
Have married into the parish.
Gained poor relief in that parish previously.
Have a seven-year apprenticeship with a settled resident.

Notes

References

Sources
Text of the Act'Charles II, 1662: An Act for the better Releife of the Poore of this Kingdom.', Statutes of the Realm: volume 5: 1628–80 (1819), pp. 401–05. URL: http://www.british-history.ac.uk/report.asp?compid=47315. Date accessed: 18 September 2007.
Workhouse.org.uk – Full Text of the Act

Acts of the Parliament of England
1662 in law
English Poor Laws
1662 in England